Calliostoma admirandum is a species of sea snail, a marine gastropod mollusk in the family Calliostomatidae.

Description

Distribution
This species occurs in the Eastern Indian Ocean off India.

References

External links

admirandum
Gastropods described in 1906